Champion Tree is a designation afforded to selected trees that are special or superlative because of their height, size or significance. A number of countries including the UK, New Zealand, US, South Africa and Canada support such designation schemes based on standardised criteria. A database of over 69,000 such designated trees in the UK, detailed by genus, species, height, girth, site, county and country is maintained at the Tree Register. This UK database dates back to 1620 and in 2022 completed the recording of its 250,000th tree.

The designations in the US are recorded in the National Register of Champion Trees.

South Africa has 82 designated Champion Trees, administered by the Department of Agriculture, Forestry and Fisheries.

References

Trees